Ravi Bhardwaj (born 31 October 1992) is an Indian professional basketball player.  He currently plays for the Punjab Steelers of India's UBA Pro Basketball League.

Career 
Ravi started playing basketball at the age of 16. He was a member of India's national basketball team at the 2016 FIBA Asia Challenge in Tehran, Iran. There, he had his teams best field goal and free throw percentage. He also represented Indian National Basketball Team in Commonwealth Games held at Gold Coast, Australia from 4 to 15 April 2018.

In 2015, he was selected as the Most Valuable Player of UBA Pro League's first season.

Ravi Bhardwaj won many medals in inter-school, inter-university and inter-college meets. Ravi finished his MBA from Panjab University.

References

External links
 2016 FIBA Asia Challenge profile
 Asia-basket.com profile
 Ravi Bhardwaj
Realgm Profile

1992 births
Living people
Centers (basketball)
Indian men's basketball players
Basketball players from Chandigarh
Panjab University alumni